The 1965 Mississippi State Bulldogs football team represented Mississippi State University during the 1965 NCAA University Division football season. The Bulldogs opened the season strong, getting to 4–0 and a top 10 ranking, but lost its last six to finish 4–6.

Schedule

References

Mississippi State
Mississippi State Bulldogs football seasons
Mississippi State Bulldogs football